The following is a list of notable print, electronic, and online Japanese dictionaries.

References

See also
List of Chinese dictionaries
List of English dictionaries
List of French dictionaries
List of etymological dictionaries

Lexicography